Bartolini Pickups and Electronics is an American company who make guitar and bass pickups and electronics, such as pre-wired harnesses, pre-amps, and EQ modules. The company was founded in 1973 by Bill Bartolini, and is based in San Luis Obispo, California.

The pickups and electronics are used by luthiers such as Michael Tobias Design, Pedulla, Overwater, Roscoe, Warrior, Elrick, Sukop, Mayones, Novax, Curbow, and Zon.  Ibanez installs Bartolini pickups, they are also sold through musical retailers as replacements to upgrade existing instruments.

History
Bill Bartolini began manufacturing magnetic pickups in 1973. He first focused on quadraphonic and hexaphonic pickups, branded under "Hi-A."

External links
Official website
William Bartolini NAMM Oral History Interview (2006)
Patricia Bartolini NAMM Oral History Interview (2006)
Guitar pickup manufacturers